The Mid West Rhinos is one of the five cricket Zimbabwean cricket franchises. They are a first-class cricket team, based in Midlands Province and the Mashonaland West area.  They play their home matches at Kwekwe Sports Club in Kwekwe.

History

In 2009, Zimbabwe Cricket announced a major restructure of domestic cricket in Zimbabwe and the traditional provincial sides were replaced with regional franchises. Midlands was renamed Mid West Rhinos and based in the mining town of Kwekwe. With the new franchise system in place the season got under way on 14 September 2009. Current captain Vusimuzi Sibanda was the first person to score a hundred under the new 'Mid West Rhinos' name as they convincingly beat the newly titled Matabeleland Tuskers by 135 runs. Sadly for the Rhinos, the season ended in a tense draw that saw the Mashonaland Eagles triumph narrowly.

The 2010/11 season was a promising one as the Rhinos retained the services of a number of top Zimbabwe players. Once again, they failed to win any trophies despite winning 4 games and only losing 2 in the newly branded Castle Logan Cup. Throughout the following seasons, the Rhinos have had many successes but failed to win any trophies.

Despite a delay to the start of the 2014/15 season, the season began with the Mid West Rhinos tipped to be one of the stronger sides in both the four day and one day competitions. However, off field issues affecting both the Rhinos and Zimbabwean cricket as a whole meant that the first part of the season saw mixed results. The only win for the Rhinos in the Logan Cup before Christmas came as a result of a poor performance by the Mashonaland Eagles in the season opener. After the Christmas break, the Rhinos showed some strong performances, bolstered by Vusi Sibanda and Malcolm Waller both of whom did not travel to the 2015 World Cup, but the One Day performances were abysmal. At the end of the season, the Rhinos won just 2 Pro50 matches but finished 2nd to Tuskers in the Logan Cup by only 3 points.

Ground Facilities

History

Kwekwe Sports Club has hosted cricket since 1952. The ground has been developed into one of the finest cricketing venues in the country and has hosted First Class cricket since 1999. The one and only One Day International at the ground was played on 11 December 2002 between Zimbabwe and Kenya which Zimbabwe won by 47 runs. The ground has however played host to a number of touring teams including West Indies, Australia, South Africa and Bangladesh.

Facilities

The Kwekwe Sports Club square has space for 5 pitches, the centre of which is used only for First Class games. The dimensions of the playing field vary depending on the game being played. For First Class games, the boundary extends to 75 yards straight down on the pitch and 71 yards square of the wicket. The boundaries are reduced for List A, Twenty20 and club cricket.

The practice facilities at the ground are among the best in the country. There are 16 grass nets used for practice that run in an unusual east-west direction. There are also 3 artificial turf nets that are used primarily for throw downs and training on bowling machines.

Ongoing Projects Within the Community 

The Mid West Rhinos have been engaged in several projects within the surrounding community.

Midlands Black Rhino Conservancy  

The Mid West Rhinos maintain close links with the Midlands Black Rhino Conservancy. The conservancy is made up of several adjoining farms that give free rein to a number of the severely endangered Black Rhino. Each year the Mid West Rhinos stage the Midlands Black Rhino Conservancy T20 tournament. The tournament has grown from humble beginnings and now boasts participating teams from South Africa and Zambia. The proceeds from the tournament and other fundraising activities go directly to the conservancy.

Mbizo Cricket Centre  

The largest venture by the Mid West Rhinos is the ongoing Mbizo Cricket centre project. Aimed at developing cricket in the underprivileged high density suburb of Mbizo, the cricket centre was part funded by the Australian Embassy and Indian auto mobile manufacturer Mahindra. The project has been vital in increasing awareness and knowledge of cricket in the area and has resulted in producing a number of decent cricketers. The project stalled in 2014 but in 2015, the Australian Embassy and prominent businessmen John and Charles Gardiner of the Cold Chain Group provided funds to complement the existing facilities with a large pavilion. Still under construction, the pavilion will include changing rooms, kitchen, running water, electricity and meeting areas.

Whilst the project was slow to gain ground, the support from the local community was immense. When club cricket was played at the centre it would not be unusual to see 60 players arriving on match day vying for a place on the team. Many of the cricketers who played for Mbizo have gone on to represent other local league teams and some have even appeared for the Rhinos.

League Cricket 

The Mid West Rhinos are solely responsible for all cricketing activity within the region. As part of their efforts to develop the game the Rhinos introduced a league. The league includes the teams;
 Kwekwe Cricket Club
 Kwekwe Queens Cricket Club
 Gweru
 Chegutu
 Chinoyi
 Kadoma
 Redcliffe Cricket Club
 Norton Cricket Club

The strongest of the sides is Kwekwe Cricket Club who consistently beat their opposition convincingly. Whilst League cricket in the area faces numerous difficulties due to the lagging local economy, the standard of cricket is fairly high with a number of the clubs fielding professional players.

Street Cricket  

The Mid West Rhinos are embarking on another project to bring "Street Cricket" to the suburb of Mbizo. The project which was started by Sporting Chance aims to give young people an opportunity to play a simple version of cricket within their community. Street Cricket can be played with just a bat and ball and it is hoped that by operating this project, the young people will be able to learn new skills and will encourage them to take up the full version of the game.

Sponsorship

Whilst the funding of local cricket comes from Zimbabwe Cricket, there is still a requirement for sponsorship from external sources. The majority of funding for League cricket comes from the Cold Chain Group. The other sponsors include Lays, Bokomo, Castle and local sponsors such as Steel Makers, Cricket Tours Africa and Vinyl Stikka Signs.

Notable Former Playing and Coaching Staff 

Despite having never won any trophies, the Mid West Rhinos have had a number of star players and coaches.

Players

Coaches

Current Coach

Current squad
Players with international caps are listed in bold.

Updated as on 26 February 2023

References

Zimbabwean first-class cricket teams